St. Andrew's Presbyterian Church may refer to:

Denominations
St. Andrew's Presbyterian Church (denomination)

Church buildings

Australia
 St Andrew's Presbyterian Church, Bowral, New South Wales
 St Andrew's Presbyterian Church, Brisbane, Queensland, now part of the Uniting Church in Australia
 St Andrews Presbyterian Church, Esk, Queensland, Australia
 St Andrew's Presbyterian Church, Manly, New South Wales
 St Andrew's Presbyterian Church, Rockhampton, Queensland, Australia
 St Andrew's Presbyterian Church, Wingham, New South Wales

Canada
St. Andrew's Presbyterian Church (Victoria, British Columbia)
St. Andrew's Presbyterian Church (Lunenburg), Nova Scotia
St. Andrew's Presbyterian Church (Kingston, Ontario)
St. Andrew's Presbyterian Church (Strathroy, Ontario)
St. Andrew's Church (Toronto), Presbyterian church in Ontario
St. Andrew's Presbyterian Church (Ottawa), Ontario
St. Andrew's Presbyterian Church (Windsor, Ontario)
St. Andrew's Church (Quebec City), Presbyterian church in Quebec
St. Andrew's Presbyterian Church (Saint-Lambert, Quebec)

New Zealand
St Andrew's First Presbyterian Church, Auckland
St Andrew's Presbyterian Church, Dunedin

Sri Lanka
St. Andrew's Presbyterian Church, Colombo, Sri Lanka

United Kingdom
St. Andrew's Presbyterian Church, Southampton, England, former Presbyterian church now merged with Avenue St. Andrew's United Reformed Church

United States
St. Andrews Presbyterian Church, Princeton, New Jersey, former Presbyterian church now merged with Nassau Presbyterian Church
St. Andrews Presbyterian Church, Raleigh, North Carolina

See also
St. Andrew's Church (disambiguation)
St Andrew (disambiguation)
Presbyterian Church (disambiguation)